Players born on or after 1 January 1991 were eligible to participate in the 2010 UEFA European Under-19 Championship. Players' age as of 18 July 2009 – the tournament's opening day. Players in bold have later been capped at full international level.

Group A

Coach:  Andreas Heraf

Coach:  Wim van Zwam

Coach:  Noel Blake

Coach:  Francis Smerecki

Group B

Coach:  Massimo Piscedda

Coach:  Ivan Grnja

Coach:  Ilídio Vale

Coach:  Luis Milla

References

External links
Official UEFA site

Squads
2010